The Barbados Football Association is the governing body of association football in Barbados. It is responsible the administration of football in Barbados with responsibility for the Barbadian national football team as well as the other Barbados National Football teams. Established in 1910, it was originally named the Barbados Football Amateur Association, but changed in 1925 to the current name. The Barbados Football Association became affiliated to FIFA in 1968, CONCACAF in 1967, and also the Caribbean Football Union.

Association staff

References

External links
 
 Barbados at the FIFA website
 Barbados at CONCACAF site

CONCACAF member associations
Football in Barbados
Football
Sports organizations established in 1910
1910 establishments in Barbados